John Young Campbell (born May 17, 1958) is a British-American economist. He is the Morton L. and Carole S. Olshan Professor of Economics at the Department of Economics at Harvard University since 1994.

Biography

Early years
Campbell was born in London, England. He attended the Dragon School, Oxford, and was a scholar at Winchester College. He graduated with a B.A. (First Class) from Corpus Christi College, Oxford in 1979. He went on to complete his MPhil and Ph.D. (1984) in economics from Yale University.

Academic career
Campbell became an assistant professor at Princeton University in 1984. He remained on the faculty at Princeton until 1994, when he joined Harvard University, where he is currently the Morton L. and Carole S. Olshan Professor of Economics.  In 2006, he was appointed a Harvard College Professor.

Campbell has received various honors, including:

 Corresponding Fellow, British Academy, 2009
 President, American Finance Association 2005
 Fellow, American Academy of Arts and Sciences, 2000
 Fellow, Econometric Society, 1990
 Honorary Fellow, Corpus Christi College, University of Oxford, 2008
 Paul A. Samuelson Award for Outstanding Scholarly Writing in Lifelong Financial Security with various co-authors 2002; 1999 and 1997
 Association of American Publishers Award for Best Professional/Scholarly Book in Economics, with Andrew Lo and Craig MacKinlay, 1997
 Research Associate, National Bureau of Economic Research (NBER), 1987
 Honorary doctorates from BI Norwegian Business School, 2018; Copenhagen Business School, 2015; Maastricht University and Universite Paris Dauphine, 2009 
 President, International Atlantic Economic Society, 2008

His invited lectures include:
 Arrow Lectures, Stanford University, 2017
 Richard Ely Lecture, American Economic Association, 2016
 Princeton Lectures in Finance, 2008
 Presidential Address, American Finance Association, 2006
 Joint Luncheon Address to American Economic Association and American Finance Association, 2002
 Marshall Lectures, University of Cambridge, 2001
 Clarendon Lectures, University of Oxford, 1999

Personal life 
Campbell is married with four adult children and lives in Lexington, Massachusetts.

Activities
Campbell is known for his research in financial economics, macroeconomics, and econometrics. He concentrates on asset pricing, portfolio choice for long-term investors, and household finance.

Campbell co-edited the American Economic Review from 1991 to 1993 and edited the Review of Economics and Statistics from 1996 to 2002.  He served on the executive committee of the American Economic Association from 2016 to 2018 and chaired the Association's Ad Hoc Committee to Consider a Code of Professional Conduct during this period. Campbell was Chair of the Harvard economics department from 2009 to 2012, he served on the board of the Harvard Management Company from 2004 to 2011, and he is a partner at Arrowstreet Capital, LP, an asset management company that he helped to found in 1999.
	
Campbell appeared in the documentary film Inside Job.

Books
Financial Decisions and Markets: A Course in Asset Pricing (Princeton University Press 2018);
The Squam Lake Report: Fixing the Financial System (with the Squam Lake Group of financial economists, PUP 2010);
Strategic Asset Allocation: Portfolio Choice for Long-Term Investors (with Luis Viceira, Oxford University Press 2002); 
The Econometrics of Financial Markets (with Andrew Lo and Craig MacKinlay, PUP 1997).
Financial Decisions and Markets: A Course in Asset Pricing. The book gives a broad graduate-level overview of asset pricing. Campbell shows the interplay of theory and evidence in his book; the interplay gives us a sense of how theorists respond to empirical puzzles, for example by developing models with new testable implications

References

External links
 John Y. Campbell at Harvard University
 CV of John Y. Campbell
 Books published by John Y. Campbell

1958 births
Living people
People educated at The Dragon School
People educated at Winchester College
Alumni of Corpus Christi College, Oxford
British emigrants to the United States
Yale Graduate School of Arts and Sciences alumni
British economists
21st-century American economists
American businesspeople
Financial economists
Harvard University faculty
Princeton University faculty
Fellows of the British Academy
Fellows of the Econometric Society
Fellows of the American Academy of Arts and Sciences
Presidents of the American Finance Association
Corresponding Fellows of the British Academy